Amin Abdel Rahman (born 31 December 1941) is an Egyptian water polo player. He competed in the 1960 and 1964 Summer Olympics.

References

1941 births
Living people
Water polo players at the 1960 Summer Olympics
Water polo players at the 1964 Summer Olympics
Egyptian male water polo players
Olympic water polo players of Egypt
Sportspeople from Cairo
20th-century Egyptian people